The Carabiniers (6th Dragoon Guards) was a cavalry regiment of the British Army. It was formed in 1685 as the Lord Lumley's Regiment of Horse. It was renamed  as His Majesty's 1st Regiment of Carabiniers in 1740, the 3rd Regiment of Horse (Carabiniers) in 1756 and the 6th Regiment of Dragoon Guards in 1788. After two centuries of service, including the First World War, the regiment was amalgamated with the 3rd Dragoon Guards (Prince of Wales's) to form the 3rd/6th Dragoon Guards in 1922.

History

The regiment was raised during the reign of James II, by Richard Lumley, 1st Earl of Scarbrough, who recruited an independent troop of horse in response to the 1685 Monmouth Rebellion. It was subsequently used to create Lord Lumley's Regiment of Horse, and ranked as the 9th Regiment of Horse; the Queen Dowager then gave approval for Lumley to use the title The Queen Dowager's Horse. 

Lumley was removed in early 1687 for refusing to admit Catholic officers, and replaced by the loyalist Sir John Talbot. Sir George Hewett took over after the 1688 Glorious Revolution, but died in 1689 during the Williamite War in Ireland, and was followed by Richard Beverley. In 1690, it became the 8th Regiment of Horse; transferred to Flanders for the Nine Years' War, it was renamed The King's Regiment of Carabineers in 1692. The regiment was ranked as the 7th Horse in 1694 and it fought at the Battle of Blenheim in August 1704 and the Battle of Ramillies in May 1706 during the War of the Spanish Succession.

The regiment was renamed the His Majesty's 1st Regiment of Carabiniers in 1740 and it took part in the response to the Jacobite rising in 1745. It was then transferred to the Irish establishment in 1746 and re-ranked as the 3rd Horse. It was next re-designated the 3rd Regiment of Horse (Carabiniers) in 1756 and then transferred back to the British establishment as the 6th Regiment of Dragoon Guards in 1788. It saw action in Flanders again in 1793 during the French Revolutionary Wars. It then became the 6th Regiment of Dragoon Guards (Carabineers) in 1826. It saw action at the Siege of Sevastopol during the Crimean War and was deployed to Afghanistan in the late 1870s during the Second Anglo-Afghan War.

Following the outbreak of the Second Boer War in South Africa, the regiment was sent there in November 1899. They took part in the relief of Kimberley in February 1900. After the war ended in June 1902, the Carabiniers was transferred to Bangalore, as part of the Madras command. 500 officers and men left Natal for India that August. In 1906, the regiment took part in the parade at the Grand Durbar (the visit of the Prince and Princess of Wales to Bangalore).

It landed in France at the outbreak of the First World War as part of the 4th Cavalry Brigade in the 1st Cavalry Division on 16 August 1914 for service on the Western Front. It took part in the Battle of Mons in August 1914, the First Battle of the Marne in September 1914, the First Battle of Ypres in October 1914 and the Second Battle of Ypres in April 1915 before going on to see further action at the Battle of the Somme in Autumn 1916, the Battle of Arras in April 1917 and the Battle of Cambrai in November 1917.

In October 1922, the regiment was amalgamated with the 3rd Dragoon Guards (Prince of Wales's) to form the 3rd/6th Dragoon Guards.

Regimental museum
The regimental collection is held in the Cheshire Military Museum at Chester Castle. Some items are also held by the Royal Scots Dragoon Guards Museum at Edinburgh Castle.

Battle honours

The regiment's battle honours were as follows:
 Early Wars: Blenheim, Ramillies, Oudenarde, Malplaquet, Warburg, Willems, Sevastopol, Delhi 1857, Afghanistan 1879-80, Relief of Kimberley, Paardeberg, South Africa 1899-1902
The Great War: Mons, Le Cateau, Retreat from Mons, Marne 1914, Aisne 1914, Messines 1914, Armentières 1914, Ypres 1915, St. Julien, Bellewaarde, Arras 1917 Scarpe 1917, Cambrai 1917 '18, Somme 1918, St. Quentin, Lys, Hazebrouck, Amiens, Bapaume 1918, Hindenburg Line, Canal du Nord, Selle, Sambre, Pursuit to Mons, France and Flanders 1914–18.

Colonels
The regiment's colonels were as follows:

1685 The Queen Dowager's Regiment of Horse
1685 Lieutenant-General Richard Lumley, 1st Earl of Scarbrough
1687 Brigadier-General Sir John Talbot
1688 Colonel Sir George Hewett, 1st Viscount Hewett
1689 Colonel Richard Beverley

1692 The King's Regiment of Carabineers
1692 Lieutenant-General Hugh Wyndham
1706 Lieutenant-General Francis Palmes
1712 Colonel Leigh Backwell
1715 Brigadier-General Richard Waring
1721 Field Marshal Richard Boyle, 2nd Viscount Shannon
1727 Lieutenant-General George MacCartney
1730 Major-General Henry Scott, 1st Earl of Deloraine KB
1731 Field Marshal Sir Robert Rich, 4th Baronet
1733 Major-General Charles Cathcart, 8th Lord Cathcart

1740 His Majesty's 1st Regiment of Carabiniers
1740 Lieutenant-General Phineas Bowles
1749 General Hon. James Cholmondeley
1750 Lieutenant-General George Germain, 1st Viscount Sackville

1756 3rd Regiment of Horse (Carabiniers)
1757 Lieutenant-General Louis Dejean
1764 Lieutenant-General Edward Harvey
1775 General Sir William Augustus Pitt KB
1780 General Sir John Irwin KB

1788 6th Regiment of Dragoon Guards
1788 General Henry Lawes Luttrell, 2nd Earl of Carhampton
1821 General Hon. Robert Taylor

1826 6th Regiment of Dragoon Guards (Carabineers)
1839 General Sir Thomas Hawker KCB
1858 Lieutenant-General Sir Alexander Kennedy Clark-Kennedy KCB KH
1860 General Sir James Jackson GCB KH
1868 Lieutenant-General Sir John Rowland Smyth KCB
1873 General Henry Richmond Jones CB
1880 General George Calvert Clarke CB
1891 Lieutenant-General Charles Sawyer
1892 Major-General Sir Alexander James Hardy Elliot KCB
1902 Lieutenant-General Sir John Fryer KCB
1917 Major-General Henry Peregrine Leader CB
 1922: regiment amalgamated with the 3rd Dragoon Guards (Prince of Wales's) to form the 3rd/6th Dragoon Guards

Uniforms and Insignia
The original uniform of the Queen Dowager's Regiment of Horse is recorded as including a red coat lined with green. In common with other regiments of Horse, cuirasses were worn until 1699. In 1715 the regimental facing colour was changed to pale yellow. In 1768 white lapels were adopted by Royal Warrant. Silver epaulettes were worn by the officers. In 1812 a new model of leather helmet was issued, carrying the title of "6th Dragoon Guards or Carabiniers". In 1861 a complete change of uniform was authorized by Queen Victoria, following the conversion of the regiment to a light cavalry role and appearance. Thereafter until 1914 the full dress of the regiment was entirely dark blue with white facings. Although the designation of Dragoon Guards was retained, the 6th was the only dragoon regiment in the British Army to wear dark blue tunics instead of scarlet. After 1873, a white plume was worn on the brass helmet.

The distinctive feature of the collar and cap badges as worn from 1900 and 1902 respectively, was the appearance of crossed carbines under a crown and above the regimental title.

See also
British cavalry during the First World War

References

Sources

External links

Cavalry regiments of the British Army
DG6
Regiments of the British Army in the Crimean War
Dragoon Guards
1685 establishments in England
1922 disestablishments in the United Kingdom
Military units and formations established in 1685
Military units and formations disestablished in 1922
Catherine of Braganza